Svetlana Gusarova (born 29 May 1959) is a Kazakhstani former track and field hurdler who competed in the 100 metres hurdles for the Soviet Union. She set her lifetime best of 12.61 seconds in 1985 in Saint Petersburg (then Leningrad). This time ranked her third in the world for that year. She also held a 60 metres hurdles best of 7.97 seconds.

Gusarova won a bronze medal in the 100 m hurdles at the 1985 IAAF World Cup, helping the Soviet women to second on the team rankings. She was a one-time national champion, winning the 60 m hurdles at the Soviet Indoor Athletics Championships in 1983.

International competitions

National titles
Soviet Indoor Athletics Championships
60 m hurdles: 1983

References

External links

Living people
1959 births
Soviet female hurdlers
Kazakhstani female hurdlers